Scott Shackleton is the chairman of the Chippewa County Board of Commissioners, and was a Republican member of the Michigan House of Representatives from 1999 through 2004. He is also a member of the International Bridge Authority, appointed by Governor Rick Snyder in March 2011.

Prior to his election to the House, Shackleton served on the Sault Ste. Marie City Commission, from 1993 through 1998. He was also news director for WSOO and WSUE.

References

Michigan city council members
County commissioners in Michigan
Republican Party members of the Michigan House of Representatives
1961 births
Living people
People from Sault Ste. Marie, Michigan
Lake Superior State University alumni
20th-century American politicians
21st-century American politicians